Ênio Vargas de Andrade (31 January 1928 – 22 January 1997) was a Brazilian football player and coach. He became most notable for his coaching achievements, winning three Brazilian league titles.

Biography 

Enio Andrade began in 1949 as centreback with São José, moving to Internacional in Porto Alegre the following year. In 1951 he moved to local rivals Grêmio Esportivo Renner, where he played until 1957.

During his time with Renner coach Selviro Rodrigues assigned him to the midfield. In 1956 he won with Brazil the Panamerican Championship in Mexico.

After ending his career as a player in 1961, Enio Andrade became coach.  He was considered a strategist and won three Brazilian championships in 1979 with Internacional (being undefeated, the only one to get this done until today) in 1981 with Grêmio (in the Estádio do Morumbi) and 1985 with Coritiba (in the Maracanã, after dispute penalties).

Enio Andrade also has international achievements in his resume, winning with Cruzeiro the Supercopa Sudamericana, Copa de Oro and the Supercopa Masters.

Enio Andrade died in 1997, at 68 years old, of pulmonary complications.

Honours

Player

Internacional
Campeonato Gaúcho: 1950 and 1951;

Renner
Campeonato Gaúcho: 1954;

Palmeiras
Taça Brasil: 1960;
Campeonato Paulista: 1959.

Coach

Internacional
Campeonato Brasileiro: 1979

Grêmio
Campeonato Brasileiro: 1981

Coritiba
Campeonato Brasileiro: 1985

Cruzeiro
Supercopa Libertadores: 1991 and 1992
Copa Ouro: 1995
Supercopa Masters: 1995
Campeonato Mineiro: 1992

Náutico
Campeonato Pernambucano: 1984.

References

1928 births
1997 deaths
Brazilian footballers
Brazil international footballers
Brazilian football managers
Campeonato Brasileiro Série A managers
Esporte Clube São José players
Sport Club Internacional players
Sociedade Esportiva Palmeiras players
Clube Náutico Capibaribe players
Clube Náutico Capibaribe managers
Grêmio Foot-Ball Porto Alegrense managers
Santa Cruz Futebol Clube managers
Sport Club do Recife managers
Esporte Clube Juventude managers
Sport Club Internacional managers
Coritiba Foot Ball Club managers
Sociedade Esportiva Palmeiras managers
Sport Club Corinthians Paulista managers
Cruzeiro Esporte Clube managers
Clube Atlético Bragantino managers
Association football midfielders
Footballers from Porto Alegre